This is a list of films produced by the American film studio Fox Searchlight Pictures (now Searchlight Pictures) from 1995 to 1999.

References 

Disney-related lists
Lists of films by studio
American films by studio